Manakamana originally referred to:
 Manakamana Temple, a sacred temple in Gorkha
Manakamana Cable Car, gondola lift that goes to the temple
"Manakamana" may also refer to:
Manakamana, Gorkha, village development committee in Gorkha
Manakamana, Sankhuwasabha, village development committee in Sankhuwasabha
Manakamana Temple (Sankhuwasabha), a temple in Sankhuwasabha
Manakamana, Syangja, village development committee in Syangja
Manakamana, Nuwakot, village development committee in Nuwakot
Manakamana (film), 2013 documentary film
Manakamana Higher Secondary School, a school in Kathmandu
Manakamana Multiple College, a school in Jhapa